Moscazzano is a comune (municipality) in the Province of Cremona in the Italian region Lombardy, located about  southeast of Milan and about  northwest of Cremona.

Moscazzano borders the following municipalities: Bertonico, Credera Rubbiano, Montodine, Ripalta Cremasca, Ripalta Guerina, Turano Lodigiano.

Main sights 

 The parish church of St. Peter was built between 1797 and 1801 in a style that already turns to the neoclassical; numerous paintings by Mauro Picenardi and fresco by Angelo Bacchetta
 The oratory of St. Charles Borromeo, built in the late 50s and later equipped with a sacristy.
 The oratory of San Donato, near a group of farmhouses, already existing in the 16th century but rebuilt in 1708
 Sanctuary of the Madonna dei Prati, a place of worship of uncertain history, dating probably before 1483
 Villa Albergoni, a 17th-century mansion. It was the main set in the  2017 film Call Me by Your Name
 Villa Groppelli, late neoclassical style villa on the edge of an English park
 Villa Marazzi, country house probably already existing in 1650, but the current appearance derives from a renovation carried out in the 18th century

People
 Camilla Marazzi

References

Cities and towns in Lombardy